L. L. Thurstone Psychometric Laboratory is a psychometrics and quantitative psychology laboratory housed within the Department of Psychology and Neuroscience at University of North Carolina at Chapel Hill. It was founded by Louis Leon Thurstone in 1952.

History
The lab was located at Nash hall from 1952 to 1967 and moved to its present location at Davie Hall in 1967.

Directors
Louis Leon Thurstone
Thelma Thurstone
Lyle V. Jones (1957–1974, 1979–1992)
John Bissell Carroll (1974–1979)
David Thissen (1992–2003)
Robert C. MacCallum (2003–2010)
Patrick J. Curran (2010–2017)
Daniel J. Bauer (2017– )

References

External links
Webpage at University of North Carolina at Chapel Hill
History
History of the Psychometric Lab

University of North Carolina at Chapel Hill buildings
Psychological testing
University and college laboratories in the United States